Target is a Japanese song by South Korean girl group T-ara. It was released on July 10, 2013.

Background and promotion
The song is a seventh Japanese single from T-ara, written and composed by MEG.ME with arrangement by KOH. The song to be included in their second Japanese album,Treasure Box. The single was released in 3 different versions: a limited CD+DVD edition and two regular CD only editions with different covers. An MV teaser was released on July 2, 2013.

Charts

Weekly charts

Oricon chart

References

2013 singles
T-ara songs
Japanese-language songs
Universal Music Japan singles
2013 songs
EMI Music Japan singles
Song articles with missing songwriters